The Elaine Paige Show is a British six-part music and chat show hosted by Elaine Paige that was broadcast by Sky Arts in 2014.

It was recorded at Riverside Studios, London and featured musical performances by Paige and guests performers from musical theatre. She also conducted masterclasses with students studying at Mountview Academy of Theatre Arts, London, and interviewed her guests.

References

External links
 

2014 British television series debuts
2014 British television series endings
2010s British music television series
2010s British television talk shows
Sky UK original programming
British television talk shows
English-language television shows